The Metal Opera is the first full-length album by Tobias Sammet's German supergroup project, Avantasia. It is a concept album and a rock opera. The album is followed by the sequel The Metal Opera Part II. Both were written over the course of a year, starting in the last quarter of 1998, and both were produced from October 1999 to June 2000, with the works being interrupted for some weeks so Sammet could produce The Savage Poetry with his other band Edguy.

The project claims that the album's title marked the first usage of the term "metal opera". Sammet also considers it his professional debut, since it marked the first time he actually made money from music, even though by that time he had already released three albums with Edguy.

According to Sammet, the album's plot is partly based on real witch trials in Fulda (his hometown) and Mainz held in the 16th and 17th centuries.

In 2019, Metal Hammer ranked it as the 25th best power metal album of all time. In 2021, they ranked it as the 18th best symphonic metal album.

Track listing

Note: "Malleus Maleficarum" is sampled from the song, "the Kingdom", by Tobias Sammet's other project, Edguy.

Credits 
 Tobias Sammet (Edguy) - Keyboards, Vocals (see "Singers")
 Henjo Richter (Gamma Ray) - Guitars
 Markus Grosskopf (Helloween) - Bass guitar
 Alex Holzwarth (Rhapsody of Fire) - Drums

Guests

Musicians 
 Guitar
 Jens Ludwig (Edguy) (lead on tracks 12 & 13)
 Norman Meiritz (acoustic on track 6)
 Keyboards
 Frank Tischer (Piano on track 11)

Singers 
 Gabriel Laymann – Tobias Sammet (Edguy) - tracks 2, 3, 5, 6, 7, 9, 11, 12 & 13
 Lugaid Vandroiy – Michael Kiske (credited as Ernie) (ex-Helloween, Unisonic) - tracks  2, 5, 6, 9, & 13
 Friar Jakob – David DeFeis (Virgin Steele) - tracks 3 & 13
 Bailiff Falk von Kronberg – Ralf Zdiarstek - tracks 4 & 7
 Anna Held – Sharon den Adel (Within Temptation) - track 6
 Bishop Johann von Bicken – Rob Rock (ex-Axel Rudi Pell, Driver, Impellitteri) - track 7 & 12
 Pope Clement VIII – Oliver Hartmann (ex-At Vance) - tracks 7, 12 & 13
 Elderane the Elf – Andre Matos (ex-Symfonia, ex-Shaaman, ex-Angra, Viper) – tracks 11, 12 & 13
 Regrin the Dwarf – Kai Hansen (Gamma Ray, ex-Helloween) - tracks 11 & 12
 Voice of the Tower – Timo Tolkki (ex-Symfonia, ex-Revolution Renaissance, ex-Stratovarius) - track 13

Charts

References 

Avantasia albums
2001 debut albums
Rock operas
Concept albums
AFM Records albums
Albums with cover art by Jean-Pascal Fournier